Albert Corbett may refer to:

 Albert H. C. Corbett (1887–1983), politician in Manitoba, Canada
 Albert T. Corbett, associate research professor of human-computer interaction at Carnegie Mellon University